Gardsjøen is a lake in the municipality of Grue in Innlandet county, Norway. The  lake is an oxbow lake that was formed by the river Glomma. Over time, this part of the river became separated from the river, forming a lake.

See also
List of lakes in Norway

References

Grue, Norway
Lakes of Innlandet